The Kelso Line was a  long North British Railway built double track branch railway line in the Borders, Scotland, that ran from a junction south of  on the Waverley Line to  (the line ended at a temporary terminus at  until 1851) via three intermediate stations,  and  where a branch line to Jedburgh joined the line.

Little of the existing railway line remains, with most of the former track now occupied by the A6968 Kelso Bypass. Kelso railway station building - where the Kelso Line turned into the Kelso Branch, continuing on to Sprouston, and terminating at Berwick Upon Tweed - is no longer standing.

History

Opening
The North Eastern Railway Kelso Branch line coming into Kelso from the west had reached Sprouston on 27 July 1849 leaving a two-mile gap between the two railheads. This gap was closed on  1 June 1851 when the North Eastern Railway line reached its destination.

Alternative route
The joined line provided part of an alternative route when the East Coast Main Line was blocked north of  most notably in August 1948 when the main line was closed for three months. The line served the same purpose in 1954.

Singling in the 1930s of the double track section between Kelso and the Waverley Route and an overall speed restriction made diversion working difficult.

Closure
Passenger services ceased on 15 June 1964 with freight services ending on 1 April 1968.

See also
The Kelso and Jedburgh railway branch lines

References

External links
The line on RailScot

Closed railway lines in Scotland
Closed railway lines in North East England
North British Railway
Pre-grouping British railway companies
Railway lines opened in 1851
Rail transport in Northumberland
Railway lines closed in 1968
1851 establishments in Scotland
1968 disestablishments in Scotland